

Walter Curt Gustav Schilling (23 December 1895 – 20 July 1943) was a German general during World War II who commanded the 17th Panzer Division. He was killed on 20 July 1943 near Izium. On 28 July 1943, Schilling was posthumously awarded the Knight's Cross of the Iron Cross.

Awards and decorations
 Iron Cross (1914) 2nd and 1st Class
 Iron Cross (1939) 2nd and 1st Class
 German Cross in Gold (28 February 1942)
 Knight's Cross of the Iron Cross on 28 July 1943 as Generalleutnant and commander of 17. Panzer-Division

References

Citations

Bibliography

 

1895 births
1943 deaths
Lieutenant generals of the German Army (Wehrmacht)
German Army personnel of World War I
Prussian Army personnel
Recipients of the clasp to the Iron Cross, 1st class
Recipients of the Gold German Cross
Recipients of the Knight's Cross of the Iron Cross
German Army  personnel killed in World War II
People from Chełmno
People from West Prussia
Reichswehr personnel
German Army generals of World War II